State Road 373 (NM 373), also known as West Union Avenue, is a  state highway on the southern border of Mesilla in Doña Ana County, New Mexico, United States, that connects New Mexico State Road 372 (NM 372) with the southern end of McDowell Road.

History
NM 373 was truncated to its current eastern terminus on November 2, 1992 in a road exchange agreement with the city of Mesilla.

Major intersections

See also

 List of state roads in New Mexico

References

External links

373
Transportation in Doña Ana County, New Mexico